The 1950–51 Scottish Districts season is a record of all the rugby union matches for Scotland's district teams.

History

Glasgow District beat Edinburgh District in the Inter-City match.

Fixtures: November 4—Midlands v. North, in the North; Glasgow and District Union v. Rest of Western Clubs, in Glasgow; Edinburgh and District Union v. South District Union, in the South. November 11—North v. South, in Midlands. November 8—East v. West Juniors, in Edinburgh. December 2—lnter-City, in Glasgow. December 16—First trial, in the South. December 23—Second trial, at Murrayfield. January 6—Final trial, at Murrayfield. January 13—Scotland v France, in Paris. February 3-Scotland v. Wales, at Murrayfield. February 24—Scotland v. Ireland, at Murrayfield. March 17—Scotland v. England, at Twickenham.

Co-Optimists played South on the 4 October 1950.

Results

Inter-City

Glasgow District:

Edinburgh District:

Other Scottish matches

South of Scotland District:

Co-Optimists: 

South of Scotland District:

Earlston, Peebles and Walkerburn: 

Co-Optimists|

South of Scotland District:

English matches

Edinburgh District:

Northumberland: 

Scottish Border XV:

Durham County:

Trial matches

Blues Trial:

Whites Trial:

International matches

No touring matches this season.

References

1950–51 in Scottish rugby union
Scottish Districts seasons